Ingrid Stöckl (born March 28, 1969 in Tamsweg) is a former Austrian alpine skier. She won a silver medal in the Combined event at the 1991 World Championships. She competed in two events at the 1994 Winter Olympics.

World Cup victories

References

1969 births
Living people
Austrian female alpine skiers
Olympic alpine skiers of Austria
Alpine skiers at the 1994 Winter Olympics